Bjelovar Synagogue (Izraelitički templ) is a former synagogue in Bjelovar, Croatia, which is currently a cultural center.

The first Jewish temple in Bjelovar was built in 1882. During the years number of Jews in Bjelovar increased, so the current temple could no longer meet the needs of Jewish community Bjelovar. The idea of building the new synagogue dates to 1913, when general assembly of the Jewish community Bjelovar, under president Jaša Hržić, decided to build a new, large and attractive synagogue. At the time, around 500 Jews lived in Bjelovar. According to calculations the synagogue construction cost 160,000 Austro-Hungarian krone. Synagogue was designed by Hönigsberg & Deutsch architect Otto Goldscheider. Construction began in 1913, and in 1917 the Art Nouveau Bjelovar Synagogue was completed. Bjelovar Synagogue was consecrated by Bjelovar chief rabbi Samuel D. Tauber and Virovitica chief rabbi H. E. Kauffmann. Torah transfer from the old synagogue to new took place on 15 August 1917. The rabbi was Lazar Margulies.

During World War II, almost all Bjelovar Jews were killed during the Holocaust. The synagogue was robbed and left devastated. After the war, Bjelovar Synagogue was turned into a theater in 1951. Domes and religious characteristics on the synagogue were removed; only the Star of David was left in the interior upper floor. Today, Bjelovar Synagogue serves as a home of culture.

Gallery

References

Ashkenazi Jewish culture in Croatia
Ashkenazi synagogues
Synagogues completed in 1917
Former synagogues in Croatia
History of Bjelovar
Art Nouveau synagogues
Buildings and structures in Bjelovar-Bilogora County
Art Nouveau architecture in Croatia
Hönigsberg & Deutsch buildings